Leda Maria Lunardi is a Brazilian-American electrical engineer whose research concerns electronics, photonics, and optoelectronics. She is a professor of electrical and computer engineering at North Carolina State University.

Education and career
Lunardi is from a large Brazilian family, part of the first generation of her family to go to college. She followed a pre-medical track in high school, but after developing an aversion to the internals of human bodies, changed her focus, switching to physics on the advice of a teacher. She studied physics at the University of São Paulo, earning a bachelor's degree in 1976 and a master's degree in 1979. She completed a Ph.D. in electrical engineering at Cornell University in 1985.

She joined AT&T Bell Labs in 1986, and worked for AT&T until moving to JDS Uniphase in 1999. In 2003, she returned to academia as a professor at North Carolina State University. From 2005 to 2007 she served as a program director for Electrical, Cyber and  Communication Systems at the National Science Foundation.

Book
With Alice C. Parker, Lunardi is co-editor of the book Women in Microelectronics (Springer, 2020), with chapters written by researchers in this area detailing their lives and research.

Recognition
Lunardi won the Achievement Award of the IEEE Lasers and Electro-Optics Society in 2000. She was named a Fellow of the IEEE in 2002, "for contributions to the development of high-performance 1.55 um monolithically integrated photoreceiver for optical communication".

References

Year of birth missing (living people)
Living people
American electrical engineers
American women engineers
Brazilian engineers
Brazilian women academics
Brazilian emigrants to the United States
University of São Paulo alumni
Cornell University alumni
Scientists at Bell Labs
North Carolina State University faculty
Fellow Members of the IEEE
21st-century American women